Canton of Les Abymes-3 is a canton in the Arrondissement of Pointe-à-Pitre on the island of Guadeloupe.

Municipalities
Since the French canton reorganisation which came into effect in March 2015, the communes of the canton are:
 Les Abymes (partly)
 Le Gosier (partly)

See also
 Cantons of Guadeloupe
 Communes of Guadeloupe
 Arrondissements of Guadeloupe

References

Abymes-3